Dmitry Valeryevich Mikhaylov (born 28 March 1976) is a Russian professional football coach and a former player.

Club career
He made his debut in the Russian Premier League in 1997 for FC Lokomotiv Nizhny Novgorod. He played two games in the UEFA Intertoto Cup 1997 for FC Lokomotiv Nizhny Novgorod.

External links
 

1976 births
Living people
Russian footballers
FC Lokomotiv Nizhny Novgorod players
Russian Premier League players
Russian football managers
Association football goalkeepers
FC Neftekhimik Nizhnekamsk players
FC Khimik Dzerzhinsk players
FC Zenit-2 Saint Petersburg players